Zbigniew Dolata (born 1 December 1965 in Koźmin) is a Polish politician. He was elected to the Sejm on 25 September 2005, getting 9880 votes in 37 Konin district as a candidate from the Law and Justice list.

See also
Members of Polish Sejm 2005-2007

External links
Zbigniew Dolata - parliamentary page - includes declarations of interest, voting record, and transcripts of speeches.

1965 births
Living people
People from Turek County
Law and Justice politicians
Members of the Polish Sejm 2005–2007
Members of the Polish Sejm 2007–2011
Members of the Polish Sejm 2011–2015
Members of the Polish Sejm 2015–2019
Members of the Polish Sejm 2019–2023
Adam Mickiewicz University in Poznań alumni
Polish schoolteachers